Sorana Cîrstea was the defending champion, but she chose to participate at the Hansol Korea Open instead.Shahar Pe'er won in the final 6–3, 6–4 against Akgul Amanmuradova.

Seeds

Draw

Finals

Top half

Bottom half

External links
Main Draw
Qualifying Draw

Singles